Sayen Rocks is a two small rock exposures, visible from northward, situated near the crest of the ice-covered heights between Miller Crag and Sutley Peak, in the Jones Mountains. Mapped by the University of Minnesota-Jones Mountains Party, 1960–61. Named by Advisory Committee on Antarctic Names (US-ACAN) for L.D. Sayen, photographer of U.S. Navy Squadron VX-6, who took part in photographing the Jones Mountains in January 1961.

Rock formations of Ellsworth Land